Vertigo (Spanish: Vértigo) is a 1951 Spanish drama film directed by Eusebio Fernández Ardavín and starring Fernando Granada, Ana Mariscal and Lina Yegros.

Cast
 Fernando Granada as Álvaro  
 Ana Mariscal as Blanca  
 Lina Yegros as María  
 Lola Ramos as Carmela  
 Félix Fernández as Don Cosme  
 Alfonso Estela as Manuel  
 Modesto Cid as Mayordomo  
 Carlos Pérez de Roza as Álvaro hijo 
 María Severini

References

Bibliography 
 España, Rafael de. Directory of Spanish and Portuguese film-makers and films. Greenwood Press, 1994.

External links 
 

1951 drama films
Spanish drama films
1951 films
1950s Spanish-language films
Films directed by Eusebio Fernández Ardavín
1950s Spanish films